The 7.62 cm FK 36(r) and Pak 36(r) (7.62 cm Feldkanone (Field gun)/36 (russisch) and Panzerabwehrkanone (Anti-tank gun) 36(russisch)) were German anti-tank guns used by the Wehrmacht in World War II. The first guns were conversions of the Soviet 76 mm divisional gun M1936 (F-22). Later in the war, the Soviet USV and ZiS-3 76 mm divisional guns were also converted.

Description
The FK36(r) and Pak 36(r) both had a split-trail carriage with a transverse leaf spring axle suspension, and steel wheels, with foam rubber filled tires. The guns were equipped with a semi-automatic vertical breech block; the recoil mechanism consisted of a hydraulic recoil buffer and a hydropneumatic recuperator. There was no limber; therefore the gun could not be towed by a horse team.

Development history
Soon after the German invasion of the USSR in 1941, Wehrmacht units encountered new Soviet tanks: the medium T-34 and the heavy KV. The thick sloped armor of these vehicles gave them a good degree of protection against German anti-tank weapons. The situation eventually led to requests for more powerful guns that would be able to destroy them from long range. Germany already had a suitable design, the 7.5 cm Pak 40, entering production in late 1941, but the first pieces were not delivered until 1942. Until enough of these could be manufactured, expedient solutions were required.

In the early stages of Operation Barbarossa, the Germans captured a large number (approximately 1,300) of Soviet 76-mm divisional guns model 1936 (F-22). Developed with anti-tank abilities in mind, this Soviet gun had powerful ballistics; it was also originally intended to use a more powerful cartridge than the one eventually adopted. However, the design had some shortcomings in the anti-tank role: the shield was too high, the two man laying was inconvenient and the sighting system was more suitable for the F-22's original divisional field gun role. Using considerable thrift, German engineers were able to quickly modify the F-22, which by that time had been adopted in original form as the FK296(r) by the Wehrmacht. In late 1941, German engineers developed a modernization program. The initial modifications that brought the guns to FK36(r) standard included:

 removing the top section of the shield and using the armour off-cuts to superimpose over the lower section of the shield. These were held in place using the standard Pak38 shield pintles.
 re-orienting the traverse gear box and handwheel shaft linkages so as to mount the traverse handwheel on the left side of the gun next to the sight. As the new transverse rod linkage went through a gap in the recoil cradle's elevation arc, the maximum elevation angle was limited to 18 degrees.
 replacing the Russian sight with a Pak 38 style anti-tank sighting block that could mount the standard ZF3x8 sighting telescope or an emergency fold out iron sight. Like the Pak 40 and Pak 97/38, the sight mount had provision for attaching an indirect sighting device - the Aushilfsrichtmittel 38 (ARM38).

The first of these converted F-22s retained the original Russian ammunition (confirmed by measuring the chamber length of 15.2 inches or 385 mm) and were still designated FK296(r) on the sight's range drum. These early anti-tank conversions are discernible as they have not been fitted with a muzzle brake. These intermediate guns had various designations, but appear mainly to have been referred to as "FK36(r)", despite their dedicated anti-tank role seeming to warrant the designation "Pak" rather than "FK". The conversion work was performed by HANOMAG, with sight blocks made by Kerner & Co in 1942 (ggn42).

Later upgrades were designated as the Pak36(r), and:
 Were rechambered for the more powerful German Pak40 cartridge - which was nearly twice as long as the Soviet one (715 mm vs 385.3 mm) and also wider (100 mm vs 90 mm), resulting in 2.4 times the propellant load; and
 Had recoil mechanism adjustments to accommodate the new recoil characteristics.

Production
The first guns were delivered in February 1942. By the end of 1942, the Germans had converted 358 pieces, with another 169 in 1943 and 33 in 1944. Additionally, 894 barrels were prepared for use in self-propelled guns. It is likely that these numbers include Pak 39(r), a similarly upgraded 76-mm M1939 (up to 300 pieces).

Employment
The FK36(r) and PaK 36(r) saw combat on the Eastern Front and in North Africa. The first employment of the FK36(r) was noted as early as March 1942 at Bir Hacheim in Libya; and, by May 1942, 117 are recorded as being in use by the Afrika Korps. The gun was well proven in combat, as demonstrated by Gunner Günter Halm (Knights Cross), who destroyed nine Valentine Tanks in a single action. The Pak 36(r) was used later in the North African campaign. The gun was actively used in both anti-tank and field artillery roles until the end of the war. As late as March 1945, the Wehrmacht still possessed 165 Pak 36(r) and Pak 39(r). The scale of use can be illustrated by the amount of ammunition consumed: 49,000 AP and 8,170 subcaliber AP shells in 1942, and 151,390 in 1943. For the sake of comparison, in 1942 the Pak 40 fired 42,430 AP and 13,380 HEAT shells; in 1943 the numbers grew significantly, to 401,100 AP and 374,000 HEAT.

The modernized barrels were also mounted in the following self-propelled guns:
Marder II Panzer Selbstfahrlafette 1 für 7.62cm PaK36(r) auf Fahrgestell PzKpfw II,  (Sd.Kfz.132) - lightly armoured tank destroyer on a Panzer II light tank chassis.
Marder III Panzerjäger 38(t) für 7.62cm PaK36(r) (Sd.Kfz.139) - lightly armoured tank destroyer on a Panzer 38(t) light tank chassis.

A number of Pak 36(r) guns were captured by the Red Army (e.g. in the Battle of Stalingrad) and were adopted by anti-tank battalions.

Summary
When the FK36(r) and Pak 36(r) reached the battlefield, they were able to destroy any contemporary tank at normal combat ranges. Although the guns were heavier and had somewhat smaller penetration figures than the purpose-built Pak 40, there is no doubt that the modernization of the F-22 provided the Wehrmacht with a very effective anti-tank gun at only a fraction of the cost of producing one from scratch.

Ammunition

The HEAT projectiles penetrated about 100–115 mm at a contact angle of 90°.

Photo gallery

Notes

References
 D 183 - 7,62cm Panzerjägerkonone 36, 7,62cm Panzerjägerkanone 36 (Pz. Sfl 1) 7,62cm Panzerjägerkanone 36 (Pz Sfl 2).- Beschreibung, Bedienung und Behandlung. OKH/Heereswaffenamt, Berlin 1942 (Gun manual).
 H.Dv. 481.85 – Merkblatt für die Munition der 7,62 cm Panzerjägerkanone 36 (7,62 cm Pak.36), Berlin 11.6.1942 (Ammo description).
 Karl R. Pawlas - Die 7,62 cm Pak 36, “Waffen Revue” No. 84/1992, Journal-Verlag, Nürnberg.
 Gander, Terry and Chamberlain, Peter. Weapons of the Third Reich: An Encyclopedic Survey of All Small Arms, Artillery and Special Weapons of the German Land Forces 1939-1945. New York: Doubleday, 1979 
 Hogg, Ian V. German Artillery of World War Two. 2nd corrected edition. Mechanicsville, PA: Stackpole Books, 1997 
 Hogg, Ian V. The Guns 1939-451st UK edition, Macdonald & Co. 1970.
 Shirokorad A. B. - The God of War of the Third Reich - M. AST, 2002 (Широкорад А. Б. - Бог войны Третьего рейха. — М.,ООО Издательство АСТ, 2002.)
 Ivanov A. - Artillery of Germany in Second World War - SPb Neva, 2003 (Иванов А. - Артиллерия Германии во Второй Мировой войне. — СПб., Издательский дом «Нева», 2003.)
 Klyuev A. etc. - German Artillery Ammunition Reference Book - M., 1943 (А.Клюев и др - Справочник по комплектации боеприпасов германской артиллерии. — М., 1943)

World War II anti-tank guns of Germany
76 mm artillery
Weapons and ammunition introduced in 1942